The Gates Chili Central School District is a public school district in Rochester, New York that serves approximately 4,000 students in most of the town of Gates and a large portion of the town of Chili in Monroe County, with over 850 employees and an operating budget of $100 million (approx. $25,628 per student).

The Gates Chili school district opened in September 1956 as a consolidation of four Union free School districts (Thomas Edison, Warren Harding, Washington Irving and Florence Brasser), approved by voters of the four districts on December 8, 1955. The District celebrated its 50th anniversary in 2006.

The average class size is 22 students (elementary), and 21 students (middle-high school). The student–teacher ratio is 13:1 (elementary), 13:1 (middle-high school).

Christopher Dailey was selected by the Board of Education to serve as Superintendent of Schools beginning in July 2019. The former superintendent, Kimberle Ward, left the position in December 2018, with Carol Stehm serving as Interim Superintendent.

Organization
The Board of Education (BOE) consists of eight members who serve rotating three-year terms. Elections are held each May for board members and to vote on the school district's budget.

Current board members are:

 Jeffrey Pettenski, President (Term ends 2020)
 Andrea Hinchey Unson, Vice-president (Term ends 2021)
 Andre (Andy) Bailey (Term ends 2021)
 Michael Bailey (Term ends 2022)
 Raymond Banks (Term ends 2020)
 Catherine (Katie) Coffee (Term ends 2020)
 Kerri Keyes (Term ends 2021)
 Francis (Frank) Muscato (Term ends 2022)
 Dr. Christine Brown Richards (Term ends 2022)

Schools

Elementary schools

Neil Armstrong Elementary School (UPK-5) (opened 1968), Principal – Lisa McGary, Assistant Principal - Jeannine Bezon
Florence Brasser Elementary School (UPK-5), Principal – Timothy Young, Assistant Principal - Meghan Bello
Walt Disney Elementary School (UPK-5) (opened 1967), Principal – Elaine A. Damelio, Assistant Principal - Sara Mucino
Paul Road Elementary School (UPK-5) (opened 1967), Principal – Peter J. Hens, Assistant Principal - Sean D'Abreu

Former
Washington Irving Elementary School (K–5) (closed 1986 due to declining enrollment. Re-opened in 1992 and closed again in 2008)
Warren Harding Elementary School (closed 1982, now Northstar Christian Academy)
Thomas Edison Elementary School (closed 1980 due to declining enrollment, now Hope Hall)

Middle school
Gates Chili Middle School (6–8) (opened 1963), Principal – Dr. Lisa Buckshaw

High school
Gates Chili High School (9–12) (opened September 1958), Principal – Kenneth Hammel

Beginning in 2005, the Gates Chili High School began extensive renovations, partnering with AScribe. The renovations, which concluded on September 11, 2008 at a cost of approximately $48,000,000 USD, created a larger library and guidance counseling wing, added a new Science Atrium, added a new front entrance, created more parking spaces for students and faculty, and built a new field house, housing an indoor track, fitness center, and pool. Residents of both Gates and Chili are eligible to sign up to use the new athletic facilities.

Phase X Capital Project and Redistricting

In October 2012, Gates Chili voters approved a measure to begin repairing infrastructure in all six of the schools. The estimated cost, $10.8 million, would be covered by state grants and reserve funds. Scheduled fixes include complete roof replacements at several of the schools, upgrading windows to provide energy conservation, and structural repairs to nearly every school. Repairs to the outdoor football and track stadium lighting is also budgeted into this project. The project began its work this past summer, and was scheduled to be completed by the end of Summer 2014.

In 2013, the Gates Chili School District proposed a redistricting for the remaining four elementary schools – Paul Road, Florence Brasser, Neil Armstrong, and Walt Disney – beginning in September 2014. The current plans would remove 75 ESOL students from Florence Brasser and split them into two sub groups at Paul Road and Walt Disney. Redistricting would also even out enrollment levels at all four schools – Paul Road and Neil Armstrong would see their enrollment cut by roughly 75 students, leaving them with 475 kids. Walt Disney would get about 61 students to put them at 475 as well, and Florence Brasser would get 67 students to put them at 350 students. The plan is still being worked out, with a deadline of Spring 2014 for a final decision.

Noted alumni

References

External links

New York State School Boards Association

School districts in New York (state)
Education in Monroe County, New York
1956 establishments in New York (state)
School districts established in 1956